MobiWire SAS is a spin-off of Sagem Wireless. MobiWire SAS was created in July 2011 with an equity investment from MobiWire Mobiles Ningbo Co LTD, formerly Sagetel Mobiles of Ningbo, China, because Sagem Wireless had gone into bankruptcy when it was majority owned by Sofinnova.

Currently, the company has shifted its focus to mid to high-range smartphones and cash payment terminals, as an Original Design Manufacturer for main European Mobile Network Operators and retailers.

They release very cheap phones like the £0.97 "pictor" that they released in August 2011.

History
Sagem Mobiles was the original name for what is now MobiWire. It was part of SAGEM, a major French company involved in defence electronics, consumer electronics and communication systems.

In 2005, SAGEM and SNECMA merged to form SAFRAN.

In 2008, the SAGEM group spun off its communications and mobile telephony businesses (known simply as Sagem Mobiles) to focus on its core business.

The broadband business was called: SAGEM Communication.

The mobile phone business was called: SAGEM Wireless.

Sagem Wireless was launched in January 2009 with investment from Sofinnova and Thierry Buffenoir became its CEO. As an independent company, Sagem Wireless undertook a shift in strategy away from the traditional ODM space of operator-branded low-range handsets and towards the design, development, and delivery of customised mid and high-range mobile devices for global lifestyle brands and mobile operators.

In the spring of 2011, Sagem Wireless was renamed Mobiwire SA and was bankrupt soon after.

On 22 July 2011, following recovery proceedings, Sagetel Mobiles made an equity investment and a partial assets transfer relying on the support of the employees and management.

The new company was named MobiWire SAS. As a white-label manufacturer, MobiWire SAS designs and delivers mobile and connected terminals to worldwide operators, brands, and retailers with the support of its factory and R&D, MobiWire Mobiles Ningbo Co Ltd.

See also
 Sagetel

References

External links
 
 http://www.realwire.com/releases/Mobiwire-Connects-Wireless-Pos-With-Launch-Of-MobiPrint
 MobiWire Unveils Secure Business Phone Portfolio With Embedded Mobile Security
 https://web.archive.org/web/20110402092224/http://www.droid-den.com/android-news/mobiwire-brings-new-ui-replacement-to-android
 MobiWire has new S:PHONE that offers unprecedented data security

Mobile phone manufacturers
French brands
Companies established in 2011
Electronics companies of France
Telecommunication equipment companies of France